Boris Burov (born 1 August 1970) is an Ecuadorian weightlifter. He competed in the men's heavyweight event at the 2000 Summer Olympics.

References

1970 births
Living people
Ecuadorian male weightlifters
Olympic weightlifters of Ecuador
Weightlifters at the 2000 Summer Olympics
Sportspeople from Moscow
Pan American Games medalists in weightlifting
Pan American Games gold medalists for Ecuador
Weightlifters at the 1999 Pan American Games
21st-century Ecuadorian people